Jean-Michel Raymond (born 24 August 1959) is a French former professional footballer who played as a goalkeeper. In his career, he played for INF Vichy, Toulouse, Lyon, and Muret.

Honours 
Toulouse

 Division 2: 1981–82

References 

1959 births
Living people
People from Koléa
French footballers
Pieds-Noirs
Association football goalkeepers
INF Vichy players
Toulouse FC players
Olympique Lyonnais players
AS Muret players

French Division 3 (1971–1993) players
Ligue 2 players
Ligue 1 players